The Karşıyaka Cemetery is a modern burial ground located at İvedik neighborhood in Yenimahalle district of Ankara, Turkey. Administered by the Metropolitan Municipality, it is the biggest cemetery in Ankara. Many prominent figures from the world of politics, business, sports and arts rest here.

End November 2009, it was reported by the director of city cemeteries that there are 260,000 graves in the Karşıyaka Cemetery, and the number of interments at the cemetery is about one thousand per month with increasing tendency. He added that "Due to increased rate of burials, it was expected that the cemetery will reach its capacity already in 2010. For this reason a much larger cemetery is projected." Karşıyaka Cemetery is the biggest cemetery in Ankara. The average number of visitors is two thousand daily.

Notable burials

 Türkân Akyol (1928–2017), female academic, politician and government minister
 Mehmet Altınsoy (1924–2007), politician, co-founder of Motherland Party (ANAP), Mayor of Ankara and Minister of State.
 Fikri Elma (1934–1999), footballer and top scorer
 Ulvi Cemal Erkin (1906–1972), pioneering symphonic composers in Turkey
 Deniz Gezmiş (1947–1972), executed Marxist–Leninist revolutionary and political activist
 Jülide Gülizar (1929–2011), anchorwoman and journalist
 İsmet Hürmüzlü (1938–2013), Iraqi Turkmen actor, screenwriter and director
 Masatoshi Gündüz Ikeda (1926–2003), Turkish mathematician of Japanese ancestry
 Cezmi Kartay (1920–2008), civil servant and politician
 Tarık Solak (1964–2020), Turkish-Australian kickboxing promoter
 Ahmet Taner Kışlalı (1939–1999), assassinated intellectual, political scientist, lawyer, columnist, academic and politician
 Ferit Tüzün (1929–1977), composer
 Bahriye Üçok (1919–1990),  assassinated female academic of theology, left-wing politician, columnist and women's rights activist

See also
 List of cemeteries in Turkey

References

External links
 

Cemeteries in Ankara
Yenimahalle, Ankara